An energy being or astral being is an alleged life form that is composed of energy rather than matter. They appear in myths/legends, paranormal/UFO accounts, and in various works of speculative fiction, also in some religions it's believed that there is a whole race of such creatures who live amongst humans; and "satan" is a rogue one of them.

Energy beings are typically rendered as a translucent glowing fluid or as a collection of flames or electrical sparks or bolts; somewhat in common with the representations of ghosts.

Energy beings have a variety of capacities. The Taelons (from Earth: Final Conflict) are barely more powerful than mortals, while others such as Star Treks Q, Stargate SG-1s Ascended Ancients/Ori, Ben 10: Alien Forces Anodites, or the Meekrob from Invader Zim possess god-like powers.

In science fiction 
 Vorlons (Babylon 5)
 Some of the First Ones (Babylon 5)
 Organians (Star Trek)
 Prophets and Pah Wraiths (Star Trek)
 The Q (Star Trek)
 Etherials (Marvel Comics)
 Ascended people (Stargate)
 Drej (Titan A.E.)
 C'tan (Warhammer 40,000)
 Naaru and Ethereals (World of Warcraft)
 The Taelons (Earth: Final Conflict)
 Gwen Tennyson and her grandmother Verdona are Anodites (Ben 10: Alien Force)
 Cirronians and possibly Vardians (Tracker)
 The astronaut David Bowman, transformed into a "Star Child" (2001 A Space Odyssey)
 Kheldians and Nictus (City of Heroes)
 FMians, AMians, UMAs, and Wizards (Megaman Starforce)
 Andromeda (Heroes of Newerth)
 The Meekrob  (Invader Zim)
 The Embers of Muuat and the Ghosts of Creuss (Twilight Imperium)
 The Zoni (Ratchet & Clank)
 Archons and Dark Archons (StarCraft)
 Zzzax (Marvel Comics)
 Pyron (Darkstalkers)
 Tornedron (Transformers)
 Living Laser (Marvel Comics)
 Singularity (Marvel Comics)
 Akira (Akira)
 Yog, an amoeba-like Energy being from Space Amoeba
 Melllvar and his mother (Futurama)
 Outsiders (XCOM: Enemy Unknown)
 Bill Cipher (Gravity Falls)
 The pure intellectuals (Skylark)
 The Novakid Race (Starbound)
 The Rakshasa (Lord of Light)
 Beyonders (Marvel Comics)
 Monica Rambeau (Marvel Comics)

See also 
 Anchimayen
 Angel
 Demon
 Jinn
 Spirit

Notes

References 

 
 

Alleged UFO-related entities
Science fiction themes
Stock characters